Zahid Hussain (born December 18, 1974 in Sargodha, Punjab, Pakistan) is a Canadian cricketer who has played for the Canada national cricket team. Hussain previously also played first-class cricket in Pakistan, being a member of the Habib Bank Limited and Sargodha cricket teams.

References

External links
Zahid Hussain at ESPNCricinfo

1974 births
Living people
Canadian cricketers
Canada One Day International cricketers
Canada Twenty20 International cricketers
Pakistani emigrants to Canada
Naturalized citizens of Canada
Pakistani cricketers
Punjabi people
Cricketers from Sargodha
Habib Bank Limited cricketers
Sargodha cricketers